Lincoln Township is one of thirteen townships in St. Joseph County, in the U.S. state of Indiana. As of the 2000 census, its population was 3,053.

Geography

Cities, towns, villages
 Walkerton

Adjacent townships
 Liberty Township (northeast)
 Polk Township, Marshall County (southeast)
 Oregon Township, Starke County (southwest)
 Johnson Township, LaPorte County (west)

Major highways

Education
 John Glenn School Corporation

Lincoln Township is served by the Walkerton-Lincoln Township Public Library.

Political districts
 Indiana's 2nd congressional district
 State House District 21
 State Senate District 5

References
 United States Census Bureau 2008 TIGER/Line Shapefiles
 United States Board on Geographic Names (GNIS)
 IndianaMap

External links
 Indiana Township Association
 United Township Association of Indiana

Townships in St. Joseph County, Indiana
South Bend – Mishawaka metropolitan area
Townships in Indiana